The economy of Cape Verde is a service-oriented economy that is focused on commerce, trade, transport and public services.  Cape Verde is a small archipelagic nation that lacks resources and has experienced severe droughts. Agriculture is made difficult by lack of rain and is restricted to only four islands for most of the year. Cape Verde's economy has been steadily growing since the late 1990s, and it is now officially considered a country of average development, being only the second African country to have achieved such transition, after Botswana in 1994. Cape Verde has significant cooperation with Portugal at every level of the economy, which has led it to link its currency (the Cape Verdean escudo) first to the Portuguese escudo and, in 1999, to the euro.

Resources 

About 75% of food is imported. Cape Verde annually runs a high trade deficit, financed by foreign aid and remittances from emigrants; remittances constitute a supplement to GDP of more than 20%. Economic reforms, launched by the new democratic government in 1991, are aimed at developing the private sector and attracting foreign investment to diversify the economy.  Since 1991, the policies the government has pursued include an open welcome to foreign investors and a far-reaching privatization program.

Fish and shellfish are plentiful, and small quantities are exported. Cape Verde has cold storage and freezing facilities as well as fish processing plants in Mindelo, Praia, and on Sal. However, the fishing potential, mostly lobster and tuna, is not fully exploited.

The economy is service-oriented, with commerce, transport, and public services accounting for almost 70% of the GDP. Although nearly 35% of the population lives in rural areas, the share of agriculture in GDP in 2010 was only 9.2% (up from 8.9% in 1995); of the 1998 total, fishing accounts for 1.5%.

The Cape Verdean government established the top priorities for development as the promotion of a market economy and of the private sector; the development of tourism, light manufacturing industries, and fisheries; and the development of transport, communications, and energy facilities. In 1994-95 Cape Verde received a total of about U.S.$50 million in foreign investments, of which 50% was in industry, 19% in tourism, and 31% in fisheries and services. Prospects for 2000 depend heavily on the maintenance of aid flows, remittances, and the momentum of the government's development program.

Mineral industry 

Mining is an insignificant contributor to the country's economy. Most of the country's mineral requirements are imported. As of 2007, production of mineral commodities was limited to clay on the islands of Boa Vista, Sal, and São Vicente; gypsum and iron ore on the island of Maio; limestone on the islands of Boa Vista, Sal, and Santo Antão; pozzolana on the island of Santo Antão; and salt on the islands of Maio and Sal. Cape Verde was not a natural gas or petroleum producer as of 2007.

Transportation 

Cape Verde's strategic location at the crossroads of mid-Atlantic air and sea lanes has been enhanced by significant improvements at Mindelo's harbor (Porto Grande) and at Sal's international airport. Ship repair facilities at Mindelo were opened in 1983, and the harbors at Mindelo and Praia were recently renovated. The major ports are Mindelo and Praia, but all other islands have small port facilities, some of which are to be expanded in the near future. In addition to the international airport on Sal, airports are located on all of the inhabited islands except for the smallest island, Brava, which was built, but found to be too dangerous so it was shut down after a few failed attempted landings. The archipelago has 3,050 kilometers (1,830 mi.) of roads, of which 1,010 kilometers (606 mi.) are paved. The new Praia International Airport is currently operative.

International recognition 

Cape Verde is considered a developing country, and is included on the list of the United Nations Small Island Developing States.

In 2007 the United Nations graduated Cape Verde from the category of Least Developed Countries, only the second time this has happened to a country.

On December 18, 2007, the General Council of the World Trade Organization approved a package for the accession of Cape Verde to the WTO. Accession was effective on July 23, 2008, 30 days after ratification by Cape Verde, which took place on 23 June. The package requires Cape Verde to adapt some of its economic regulation. In particular, it will need to introduce a new Customs Code, and to introduce copyright and patent laws complying with the Agreement on Trade-Related Aspects of Intellectual Property Rights. According to the World Intellectual Property Organization (WIPO), Cape Verde does not have legislation for industrial property, such as patents, trademarks, and industrial designs but does have a law on copyrights (Law No. 101/III/90, December 1990). Pascal Lamy, director-general of the WTO said, "I am very pleased to welcome Cape Verde as a new member. This new membership will strengthen multilateral trading system. Being part of the WTO will enable Cape Verde to continue its integration into the world economy."

Data 
The following table shows the main economic indicators in 1980–2017.

See also 
 Cape Verdean escudo
 United Nations Economic Commission for Africa

Notes

References 
 CIA World Factbook

External links 
 World Bank: Cape Verde - Data & Statistics
 Instituto Nacional de Estatística  National Institute of Statistics
 Banco de Cabo Verde  Central Bank of Cape Verde
 Bolsa de Valores de Cabo Verde  Cape Verdean Stock Exchange
 
 Cape Verde latest trade data on ITC Trade Map

 
Cape Verde
Cape Verde